NVIDIA GTC (GPU Technology Conference) is a global AI conference for developers that brings together developers, engineers, researchers, inventors, and IT professionals. Topics focus on artificial intelligence (AI), computer graphics, data science, machine learning and autonomous machines. Each conference begins with a keynote from Nvidia CEO and Founder Jensen Huang, followed by a variety of sessions and talks with experts from around the world.

It originated in 2009 in San Jose, California, with an initial focus on the potential for solving computing challenges through GPUs. In recent years, the conference focus has shifted to various applications of artificial intelligence and deep learning, including: self-driving cars, healthcare, high performance computing, professional visualization, and Nvidia Deep Learning Institute (DLI) training.

History 
GTC 2018 attracted over 8,400 attendees. Due to the COVID pandemic of 2020, GTC 2020 was converted to a digital event and drew roughly 59,000 registrants. The 2021 GTC keynote, which was streamed on YouTube on April 12, included a portion that was made with CGI using the Nvidia Omniverse real-time rendering platform. Due to the photorealism of the event, including a model of CEO Jensen Huang, news outlets reported not being able to discern that a portion of the keynote was CGI until later revealed in a blog post on August 11.

2021 notable speakers by industry sector

Research 
 Geoffrey Hinton
 Yann LeCun
 Jürgen Schmidhuber
 Daphne Koller
 Yoshua Bengio, Full Professor, University of Montreal
 Rommie Amaro, Director, National Biomedical Computation Resource, University of California, San Diego
 Founder and Scientific Director, Mila - Quebec Artificial Intelligence Institute
 Peter Boyle, chair, Computational Quantum Field Theory, University of Edinburgh
 Soumith Chintala, Research Engineer, Facebook AI
 Francois Chollet, Software Engineer, Google
 Lillian Chong, Associate Professor, University of Pittsburgh
 Joseph Glover, Provost and SVP for Academic Affairs, University of Florida
 Ken Goldberg, Professor, University of California, Berkeley
 Sepp Hochreiter, Head of the Institute for Machine Learning, Kepler U. Linz
 Hatem Ltaief, Principal Research Scientist, Kaust
 Sriram Raghavan, VP IBM Research AI, IBM
 Raquel Urtasun, Professor, Department of Computer Science, University of Toronto

Architecture, engineering, construction and design 
 Amy Bunszel, EVP AEC Design Solutions, Autodesk
 Lori Hufford, VP, Applications Integration, Bentley Systems

Automotive 
Topics around autonomous vehicles: techniques for developing safer, more efficient transportation, advancements in autonomous driving, end-to-end vehicle simulation, robotaxis, and trucking.
 Jesse Levinson, co-founder and CTO, Zoox
 Hildegard Wortmann, Member of the Board of Management, Audi AG

Finance 
Sessions concern impacts of technology advances in financial technology (Fintech). Presentations focus on how companies, consumers, and money interact across industries and how AI allows Fintech interactions to be personalized with recommendation engines, how self-service uses conversational AI, how transactions are secured with fraud-detection models.
 Jie Chen, managing director in Corporate Model Risk, Wells Fargo
 Gerald Hanweck, VP, Software Eng, CBOE Global Markets
 Richard Huddleston, executive director, Morgan Stanley
 Ashok Srivastava, SVP and Chief Data Officer, Intuit

Healthcare 
Sessions concern impacts of technology advances in healthcare.
 Ross Mitchell, AI Officer, Moffitt Cancer Center
 David Mobley, Professor, Pharm Sciences and Chemistry, University of California, Irvine
 David Ruau, Head of Global Data & Decision Science, Bayer
 Edward Suh, Mg Dir Research Information Services, St. Jude Children's Research Hospital

Media, entertainment and gaming 
 Vicki Dobbs Beck, Executive In Charge, ILMxLAB
 Rob Legato, VFX Supervisor, Titanic, The Jungle Book, The Lion King
 Kim Libreri, CTO, Epic Games
 Perry Nightingale, SVP and Head of Creative, WPP
 Abhay Parasnis, CTO and Chief Product Officer, Document Cloud, Adobe

Retail 
 Rob Armstrong, Director of Data Science, Tesco
 John Bowman, Director of Data Science, Walmart

Telecommunications 
Sessions address subject matters concerning telecommunications and 5G: 5G network acceleration and security, AI-on-5G applications, and 6G research.
 Ganesh Harinath, VP and CTO, 5G MEC, Verizon Media
 Pardeep Kohli, President and CEO, Mavenir
 Shailesh Shukla, VP/GM Networking, Google Cloud
 Alex Sinclair, CTO, GSMA

2022 Notable Speakers and Sessions 

 Jensen Huang, Founder and CEO, NVIDIA: GTC 2022 Keynote
 Andrew Ng, Founder and CEO, DeepLearning.AI, Landing AI: The Data-centric AI Movement
 Lina Halper, Principal Animation Engineer, NVIDIA: Deep Dive: One Click Animation Retargeting in Omniverse
 Douwe Kiela, Head of Research, Hugging Face: BigScience: Building a Large Hadron Collider for AI and NLP
 Prof. Dr. Bjorn Stevens, Director of the Department The Atmosphere in the Earth System, Max Planck Institute for Meteorology: Digital Twins for Understanding and Adapting to Climate Change
 Doruk Sonmez, Intelligent Video Analytics Engineer, OpenZeka: End-to-end Edge Solutions: Navigating Pre-qualified Hardware, Software, and Sensors for your NVIDIA Jetson Deployment

Conference topics

Accelerated computing and developer tools 
 Algorithms / Numerical Techniques ; Libraries / Runtimes ; Performance Optimization ; Profilers / Debuggers / Code Analysis ; Programming Languages / Compilers

Computer vision  
 Research ; Intelligent Video Analytics ; Image Processing

Cybersecurity and Fraud detection

Data science

Data center 
 Data Center / Cloud - Business Strategy ; Data Center / Cloud Infrastructure - Technical ; Data Center CPUs ; Networking ; Virtualization

Deep learning 
 Frameworks ; Inference ; Training

Internet of things (IoT), 5G, edge computing 
 Signal & Sensor Processing

Graphics 
 AI Applications, Art ; Animation / VFX / Virtual Production ; Production Rendering and Ray Tracing ; Real-Time Rendering and Ray Tracing

High performance computing (HPC) 
 Astronomy / Astrophysics ; Climate / Weather / Ocean Modeling ; Computational Chemistry and Materials Science ; Computational Fluid Dynamics ; Computational Physics ; Quantum Computing ; Supercomputing ; Scientific Visualization

Conversational AI and natural language processing

Recommenders and personalization

Autonomous machines 
 Robotics ; Robotics Research ; Reinforcement Learning

3D design collaboration and simulation

Video streaming and conferencing

XR (virtual and augmented reality)

References

Conferences